Chandrashekhar Agashe College of Physical Education (CACPE) is an Indian autonomous research college based in Gultekdi, Pune, Maharashtra, India. The university specializes in sports and physical education. It was founded on July 1, 1977, by Shivrampant Damle, who began work for its founding in 1938. It was named after Chandrashekhar Agashe. The university is affiliated to the Savitribai Phule Pune University.

References

External links 

Universities and colleges in Pune
Universities and colleges in Maharashtra
Colleges in India
1977 establishments in India
Educational institutions established in 1977